Graeme Davidson (born 18 January 1968) is a Scottish former footballer who played as a defender for Stenhousemuir and Livingston.

Career

Playing career
Davidson started his career at Dunfermline Athletic but only made one appearance for the Pars before departing the club in 1989.

He signed for Berwick Rangers and went on to make 135 appearances for the Wee Gers, which put him in the top 50 for all-time appearances at the club.In 1992-92, Davidson won the Skol League Cup sprint competition to find the fastest footballer over 60m in the Scottish Leagues.  He recorded the fastest time of 7.13 seconds.

The defender joined Meadowbank Thistle in 1993 and was part of the side that moved to Livingston in 1995.Davidson made 99 appearances altogether during his time at Meadowbank Thistle and Livingston.

Davidson signed for Stenhousemuir in 1998 and quickly became a fan favourite.He was troubled with injuries at this stage of his career and made just 77 appearances in 4 years for the Warriors.

Personal life
In 2010, Davidson was charged over an alleged £355,000 mortgage fraud.  He was arrested during a police probe into fraud and money laundering.

References

External links
Graeme Davidson on Soccerbase

1968 births
Living people
Scottish footballers
Scottish Football League players
Association football defenders
Livingston F.C. players
Dunfermline Athletic F.C. players
Stenhousemuir F.C. players
Berwick Rangers F.C. players
Footballers from Edinburgh
Scottish Junior Football Association players